Dan Miller (born January 26, 1963) is an American  sportscaster based in Detroit, Michigan. He currently works as the sports director and anchor on WJBK ("Fox 2") and as a radio play-by-play announcer on the Detroit Lions Radio Network.

Early life

Childhood
Miller was born in Washington, D.C. and raised there and in Northern Virginia. It was there he fell in love with sports. He played several sports as a child such as basketball, football, and baseball. He says his father wasn't a sports fan but he always took him to his games and practices.

High school
As a teenager, Miller often attended Baltimore Orioles, Baltimore Colts and Washington Redskins games with his father, who was a season ticket holder to the latter, even though "he didn't even know how to keep score", according to Miller. He also never missed one of his basketball, baseball or football games when Miller was on the team.

Early career
Upon graduating high school, Miller, got a job at Mutual Radio Network affiliates WJLA and WTEM as a college student to help as an engineer for their weekend sportscasts. At the job interview, he was asked if he knew how to edit audio tape. He lied and said he could. He kept the job for 11 years. Miller attended George Mason University.

In 1992, Miller got a job at WTNT ("Sports Radio 570") in Washington, D.C. as an overnight talk show host and Washington Redskins beat reporter. He only worked there for 3 months.

In 1994, he got his first job in TV at WTTG as host of the Washington Redskins pre-game show. In 1995, he got a job at WJLA-TV as weekend sports anchor.

From 1994−1997, Miller was a play-by-play announcer for NFL on Fox's regional broadcasts.

Current positions

Television
In 1997, he joined Detroit's WJBK (Fox 2) as sports director and on-air personality. 
He is the sports director, sports anchor and host of weekly sports discussion show Sports Works on the station.  
 Miller's voice can also be heard announcing during The Ford Lions Report when Lions highlights clips are shown. The program is broadcast statewide in Michigan.

Miller also regularly appears via satellite to discuss the Lions on NFL Network's pre-game show NFL Game Day Morning during the "Word on the Street" segment.

Radio
Since 2005, Miller has been the radio play-by-play announcer for the NFL's Detroit Lions as well the host of their official pre-game discussion show The Lions Roundtable on the Detroit Lions Radio Network, teaming with long-time color commentator Jim Brandstatter, and sideline reporter Tony Ortiz. Miller replaced longtime Lions play-by-play man Mark Champion. This is not Miller's first stint as a Lions broadcaster, however; he was the play-by-play announcer for pre-season games on the Detroit Lions Television Network from 2001 to 2003.

Miller also hosts The Lions Review Show Mondays at 7:00 PM ET on WXYT-FM during the NFL season.

Community involvement and awards

Miller is an active member of the Detroit Sports Media (formerly Detroit Sports Broadcasters Association) founded in 1948 by pioneer Detroit Tigers announcer Ty Tyson. 
The Detroit Free Press named Miller the "best local TV sportscaster" for 2004. In 2013, Miller was awarded the Ty Tyson Award by Detroit Sports Media for excellence in sports broadcasting.

Memorable calls

After the final game of the 0-16 2008 season, Miller eloquently summed up the whole year in a few sentences:

After the Lions defeated the Washington Redskins on September 27, 2009, snapping a 19-game losing streak, the 2nd longest in NFL history, Miller proclaimed:

After the Lions defeated the Cleveland Browns on November 22, 2009, Miller proclaimed:

The final touchdown against the San Diego Chargers on Christmas Eve 2011:

The go ahead touchdown against the Dallas Cowboys on a fake spike by Matthew Stafford:

The game winning hail mary against the Green Bay Packers on December 3, 2015:

Stafford's game-winning touchdown pass against the Washington Redskins on October 23, 2016:

Golden Tate's game-winning touchdown in overtime against the Minnesota Vikings

Stafford's game-winning touchdown pass with no time left to T. J. Hockenson against the Atlanta Falcons on October 25, 2020:

Jared Goff's game-winning touchdown pass to Amon-Ra St. Brown against the Minnesota Vikings on December 5, 2021:

Personal life
Miller is married and has 4 children.

References

1963 births
Living people
Detroit Lions announcers
Television in Detroit
National Football League announcers
American television sports announcers
American sports radio personalities
People from Washington, D.C.
People from Virginia